Dainville is a commune in the Pas-de-Calais department in the Hauts-de-France region of France.

Geography

Population

Places of interest
 The church of St. Martin, dating from the thirteenth century.

Twin towns
Dainville is twinned with the following town:
 Whitstable, Kent, England

See also
Communes of the Pas-de-Calais department

References

External links

 The CWGC cemetery at Dainville
 The communal cemetery
 Official website of Dainville 
 Official website of the communauté urbaine d'Arras 

Communes of Pas-de-Calais